The 2015 season was the Kansas City Chiefs' 46th in the National Football League (NFL), their 56th overall and their third under the head coach/general manager tandem of Andy Reid and John Dorsey. The Chiefs went through a poor start in their first six games as they were 1–5, and lost their star running back, Jamaal Charles, to a torn ACL in his right knee during an 18–17 Week 5 loss at home against the Chicago Bears. In week 16, after their ninth consecutive victory and the Baltimore Ravens defeating the Pittsburgh Steelers, the Chiefs clinched a playoff berth, their second in three years. They are the first team since the 1970 Cincinnati Bengals to start the season 1–5 and qualify for the playoffs. They also set the franchise record for the most consecutive victories, winning 10 in a row (which has since been eclipsed by the 2019–2020 Chiefs). In their Wild Card matchup, the Chiefs were set up to play against the Houston Texans. The Chiefs shutout the Texans 30–0 to earn their first playoff win in 22 years. The shutout was the Chiefs first ever playoff shutout and remains, as of the 2021-22 playoffs, the most recent playoff shutout in the NFL. The following week, they were defeated by the New England Patriots in the Divisional round 27–20.

Two Chiefs took home awards at the 5th Annual NFL Honors honoring performances from the 2015 season. Cornerback Marcus Peters won Defensive Rookie of the Year after leading the NFL in interceptions. Safety Eric Berry won Comeback Player of the Year after a being named All-Pro the year after having his season cut short due to a lymphoma diagnosis.

As of 2023, the 2015 season is the most recent season that the Chiefs did not win their division.

Roster changes

Offseason

Reserve/future free agent contracts

Cuts

Trades

Free agents

2015 draft class

Notes
 The Chiefs traded their fifth-round selection (No. 154 overall) to the New Orleans Saints in exchange for guard Ben Grubbs.
 The Chiefs traded their 3rd round pick (80th overall) and their 6th round pick (193rd overall) to the Minnesota Vikings for their 3rd round pick (76th overall)

Preseason transactions

Cuts

Regular season transactions

Suspensions served

Cuts

Signings

Players involved in multiple transactions
This list is for players who were involved in more than one transaction during the season

*Indicates player was signed off the practice squad of the team listed

Staff

Final roster

Schedule

Preseason

Regular season

Note: Intra-division opponents are in bold text.

Postseason

Game summaries

Regular season

Week 1: at Houston Texans

With the win, the Chiefs started their 2015 campaign at 1–0.

Week 2: vs. Denver Broncos

The Broncos would score two touchdowns in the final minute to steal the win from the Chiefs. The second touchdown was a critical fumble by running back Jamaal Charles.

With the heartbreaking and stunning loss, the Chiefs fell to 1–1, and picked up their seventh straight loss to Denver.

Week 3: at Green Bay Packers

In a rematch of the 2011 game, the Chiefs fell to 1–2.

Week 4: at Cincinnati Bengals

Cairo Santos would kick 7 field goals in this game, setting a new franchise record for most field goals in one game by a Kansas City kicker. The 7 kicks also tied an NFL record. However, the 7 field goals by Santos were not enough to beat the Bengals, as the Chiefs fell to 1–3.

Week 5: vs. Chicago Bears

The Chiefs would build a 17–3 lead at one point, but Chicago would pull off a miraculous comeback to win 18–17. The Chiefs tried a 66-yard field goal, but Santos kick went wide right and missed everything near the goalposts. During this game, the Bears fans at times outnumbered the Chiefs fans, as Chicago fans are best known for good travel.

With the loss, Kansas City fell to 1–4. They would also lose Jamaal Charles for the season, as he tore his ACL in this game.

Week 6: at Minnesota Vikings

With their fifth straight loss, the Chiefs fell to 1–5.

Week 7: vs. Pittsburgh Steelers

Ben Roethlisberger would not play in this game for the Steelers, so backup quarterback Landry Jones led the way for the Steelers. In his first career start, the Chiefs defense would force 3 turnovers, 2 of them interceptions, and the Chiefs would hold on to win 23–13.

With the win, the Chiefs improved to 2–5.

Week 8: vs. Detroit Lions
NFL International Series

In their first ever game in London, the Chiefs routed the crestfallen 1–6 Detroit Lions. With the win, Kansas City improved to 3–5.

Week 10: at Denver Broncos

Broncos quarterback Peyton Manning would set the all-time record for most passing yards in NFL history in this game, but the Chiefs defense would have themselves a day, picking off Bronco quarterbacks five times, four on Manning, one on Brock Osweiler, and the Chiefs routed the Broncos, 29–13.

With the win, the Chiefs went to 4–5, and snapped their seven-game losing streak against the Broncos.

Week 11: at San Diego Chargers

With the huge win, Kansas City went to 5–5, and climbed back into playoff contention.

Week 12: vs. Buffalo Bills

With the win, Kansas City went to 6–5.

Week 13: at Oakland Raiders

With the win, the Chiefs went to 7–5.

Week 14: vs. San Diego Chargers

With the low-scoring win, the Chiefs went to 8–5 and swept the Chargers for the second straight season.

Week 15: at Baltimore Ravens

Rookie Marcus Peters would put the dagger into the Ravens, as he returned an interception 90 yards for a touchdown. With the win, the Chiefs went to 9–5.

Week 16: vs. Cleveland Browns

The Browns, led by Johnny Manziel, attempted a comeback to put a stop to Kansas City's playoff hopes, but Cleveland did not have any timeouts remaining, and they ultimately ran out of time when Manziel couldn't advance the ball down the field fast enough.

With the win, the Chiefs went to 10–5 and clinched a playoff spot.

Week 17: vs. Oakland Raiders

With their 10th straight win, the Chiefs ended their season at 11–5. They were the first team to end a season with 10 or more consecutive wins since the 2012 Broncos won 11 in a row to end their season.

Postseason

AFC Wild Card Playoffs: at (4) Houston Texans

The Texans, who won the AFC South division with a 9–7 record, were completely crushed by the Chiefs. The Chiefs were the first team since the 2006 Bears to score a kick return touchdown on the opening play of the playoffs, when Knile Davis returned the opening kick 106 yards for a touchdown. After that, the game started to slow down, with both teams going three-and-out before a string of turnovers, Eric Berry's interception of Brian Hoyer, Brian Cushing's interception of Alex Smith two plays later, and a Hoyer fumble recovered by Dontari Poe on the ensuing drive. The Chiefs made a field goal on the drive, and although the team was able to get to the 2-yard line, a negative run by J. J. Watt and another interception by Hoyer ended the Texans' closest chance at scoring in the entire game. Although the Texans' defense forced a three-and-out, Hoyer threw his third interception to Marcus Peters on the second play of their drive.

The win was Kansas City’s first playoff win since 1993, ironically in The Astrodome.

AFC Divisional Playoffs: at (2) New England Patriots

The Chiefs, who had won 11 straight, travelled to Gillete Stadium to face the Patriots, who had advanced to the AFC Championship for the last five years. The Patriots scored first blood with a Rob Gronkowski touchdown catch, followed by a Cairo Santos field goal for Kansas City. The pattern was duplicated in the second quarter, with Tom Brady rushing for a score before Santos kicked another field goal. In the third quarter, after Gronkowski scored his second TD, Alex Smith threw his first to Albert Wilson. The Patriots responded with two fourth-quarter field goals to make the score 27–13 with 10:20 left. Although the Chiefs engineered a touchdown drive late in the game, the drive took up over 5 minutes, and the Chiefs had to force a three-and-out (with three timeouts) to have a chance. On second down, when Brady threw the ball instead of running it to waste time, the ball was batted and miraculously caught by Julian Edelman for a first down, ending the game.

Standings

Division

Conference

References

External links
 

Kansas City
Kansas City Chiefs seasons
Kansas City Chiefs